Camilla Grudova is a Canadian writer. She is known for The Doll's Alphabet, published by Fitzcarraldo Editions, and the novel Children of Paradise.

Grudova originally posted stories on her Tumblr blog before being spotted by an editor from The White Review.

Her story, "Waxy" (Granta 136) was nominated for a British Fantasy Award for short fiction and won the Shirley Jackson Award for best novelette.

References

External links 
 United Agents

Living people
21st-century Canadian novelists
Canadian women novelists
Year of birth missing (living people)